Brighton School (Toronto) is a private elementary/secondary school in Toronto, Ontario, Canada, providing small classes for students with learning challenges. Inspected by the Ontario Ministry of Education, the school's curriculum offers credits toward the Ontario Secondary School Diploma, and it is a member of the Ontario Federation of Independent Schools.

History 

Brighton School was founded in 2003 to offer special education classes. In 2018, its enrollment was 70 students, elementary through high school. The National Post reported, "Many of Brighton's students attend for a period of remedial learning before returning to their school of choice. For teens not in a position to move on to another high school, Brighton provides necessary life skills and real-world preparation so that they are able to enter the workplace, community college or a vocational program."

In 2019, the average annual tuition cost was CAD$24,225.

Brighton Launch adult program 
In 2015, Brighton School created the Brighton Launch adult program for "students over the age of 18 who had finished high school yet needed more hands-on life experience", according to the National Post. According to Executive Director Kathy Lear, Brighton Launch offers a unique curriculum, "transitions to adulthood skills", which emphasizes career development, workplace, life skills, and community. The program provides practical day classes, work placements, and an internal work experience producing bath bombs, lip balm and lotions which participants sell on Etsy and at craft shows. Brighton Launch also sponsors Friday night socials for students aged 13 and over.

References

External links 

2003 establishments in Ontario
Private schools in Toronto
Special schools in Canada
Educational institutions established in 2003